is a railway station on the Minamiaso Railway Takamori Line in Minamiaso Village, Aso District, Kumamoto Prefecture. The station name when written in kana has 16 characters, making it the fifth longest station name in Japan, along with Yanagawa Kibōnomori Kōen-mae Station on the Abukuma Express Line.

Since the 2016 Kumamoto earthquakes, the station has suspended operations due to severe damage on the line.

Station layout 
The station has a single platform with one track. The station building has a castle-like appearance, reminiscent of Shimoda Castle, which was located in the vicinity during the Tensho era. The station is unmanned and has a hot spring bath. The water is mineral-free, and there is no open-air bath.

Usage

History 

 February 12, 1928 - opened as Aso Shimoda Station.
 February 20, 1971 - the station became unmanned.
 April 1, 1986 - the station was converted from the Takamori Line of the Japanese National Railways to Minamiaso Railway.
 August 1, 1993 - the station was renamed Aso Shimotajo Fureai Onsen Station. A new station building with hot spring facilities was completed.
 April 14–16, 2016 - the Kumamoto Earthquake caused damage to bridges and tunnels on the Takamori line, and operations have since been suspended.

References

External links 

 Official website (in Japanese)

Railway stations in Kumamoto Prefecture
Railway stations in Japan opened in 1928